Glass Heart is Mel Parsons' fourth album, released on 30 November 2018 on Cape Road Recordings. The concept of the album name came from comparing ones heart to a fragile object that smashes if it is dropped.

Album development
Parsons wrote the songs of the album starting in 2017 in Lyttelton, New Zealand, but many of the songs were born from insomnia while touring, or holed up in remote isolated cabins with a piano in Washington. Many of the songs were written in North America, in Ohio, the Midwest, California, and on Prince Edward Island in Canada. Although Parsons is constantly writing songs, the songs that were recorded were her most recently written. The producer, Mitchell Froom, wasn't told which were the newly written songs or the older ones, but he shelved the older ones, not feeling the needed vibe.

Glass Heart is the first album Parsons recorded outside of New Zealand, in Santa Monica, California, USA. The recording location was a result of linking up with producer Mitchell Froom, who was suggested to Parsons by Ron Sexsmith when he performed a duet with Parsons on a track on her Drylands album. After hearing Drylands, Froom agreed to work with Parsons, and they had a trial run in the studio in 2017 to determine if they were compatible, which they decided they were.  Froom had a window of opportunity to record with Parsons in between a couple of albums he was producing, while Parsons was touring solo across North America. Even though Parsons had a backing band back in New Zealand, but it was impractical to bring them to the US for the recording sessions, so Froom assembled the band from local musicians, Kaveh Rastegar who plays bass for John Legend and Sia, Adam Levy who plays guitar for Norah Jones, and Ted Poor who plays drums for Andrew Bird. Parsons stepped away from co-producer duty for this album, and under the helm of Froom most of the songs were first or second takes, with Parsons singing her vocals live to tape for the majority of the tracks.

Track list

Personnel

Musicians
 Mel Parsons – vocals, guitars
 Adam Levy - guitars
 Kaveh Rastegar - bass
 Ted Poor - drums
 Mitchell Froom - keyboards
 Josh Logan - vocals
 Jed Parsons - vocals

Production
 Mitchell Froom - producer
 Oliver Harmer - mastering
 David Boucher - engineering, mixing
 Lisa MacIntosh - photography
 Barny Bewick - cover design

Chart

References

2018 albums
Mel Parsons albums